Joseph Judah (Born Dec 13 1984) is an American Canadian fighting in the junior middleweight division. Joe is the brother of welterweight champion Zab Judah and former U.S. Boxing Association light heavyweight champion Daniel Judah. His trainer is his father, Yoel Judah. Judah has a professional record of 4 wins with no losses and one knockout.

External links

Notes

Judah family
1984 births
Living people
Black Hebrew Israelite people
Canadian male boxers
American male boxers
Light-middleweight boxers